Voronino is a rural locality in Kudintsevky Selsoviet Rural Settlement, Lgovsky District, Kursk Oblast, Russia. Population:

Geography 
The village is located on the Seym River, 51.5 km from the Russia–Ukraine border, 67 km west of Kursk, 3.5 km north-west of the district center – the town Lgov, 4 km from the selsoviet center – Kudintsevo.

 Climate
Voronino has a warm-summer humid continental climate (Dfb in the Köppen climate classification).

Transport 
Voronino is located 41 km from the road of regional importance  (Fatezh – Dmitriyev), 16 km from the road  (Konyshyovka – Zhigayevo – 38K-038), 2.5 km from the road  (Lgov – Konyshyovka), 5.5 km from the road  (Kursk – Lgov – Rylsk – border with Ukraine), on the road of intermunicipal significance  (Lgov – Kudintsevo), 0.5 km from the nearest railway station Sherekino (railway line Navlya – Lgov-Kiyevsky).

The rural locality is situated 73 km from Kursk Vostochny Airport, 149 km from Belgorod International Airport and 276 km from Voronezh Peter the Great Airport.

References

Notes

Sources

Rural localities in Lgovsky District